Goshen is a town in Sullivan County, New Hampshire, United States. The population was 796 at the 2020 census.

History 

Incorporated in 1791, Goshen was first settled in 1768 as a part of Saville (now Sunapee). The name "Goshen" may have been taken from Goshen, Connecticut, where many residents had relatives.

Geography 
Goshen is drained by the South Branch Sugar River and its tributaries Blood Brook and Gunnison Brook, and hence lies almost fully within the Connecticut River watershed. Most of the southeast part of town is drained by Cherry Brook, one of the headwaters of the Ashuelot River, a southwest-flowing tributary of the Connecticut, but a small area at the southeast corner of town has the headwaters of the east-flowing West Branch Warner River, part of the Merrimack River watershed. 

The long ridge of Mount Sunapee occupies the eastern edge of town.

New Hampshire Route 10 passes through the western part of the town, including Goshen village, and leads north to Newport and south to Keene. New Hampshire Route 31 has its northern terminus at Route 10 and leads southeast to Hillsborough.

Adjacent municipalities
 Sunapee, New Hampshire (north)
 Newbury, New Hampshire (east)
 Bradford, New Hampshire (southeast at one point)
 Washington, New Hampshire (south)
 Lempster, New Hampshire (southwest)
 Unity, New Hampshire (west)
 Newport, New Hampshire (northwest)

Demographics 

As of the census of 2000, there were 741 people, 279 households, and 219 families residing in the town.  The population density was 32.9 people per square mile (12.7/km2).  There were 389 housing units at an average density of 17.3 per square mile (6.7/km2).  The racial makeup of the town was 97.03% White, 1.62% Native American, 0.13% Asian, 0.13% from other races, and 1.08% from two or more races. Hispanic or Latino of any race were 0.40% of the population.

There were 279 households, out of which 33.3% had children under the age of 18 living with them, 64.5% were married couples living together, 9.7% had a female householder with no husband present, and 21.5% were non-families. 17.2% of all households were made up of individuals, and 7.2% had someone living alone who was 65 years of age or older.  The average household size was 2.63 and the average family size was 2.96.

In the town, the population was spread out, with 24.2% under the age of 18, 8.0% from 18 to 24, 27.5% from 25 to 44, 26.7% from 45 to 64, and 13.6% who were 65 years of age or older.  The median age was 40 years. For every 100 females, there were 97.6 males.  For every 100 females age 18 and over, there were 96.5 males.

The median income for a household in the town was $42,625, and the median income for a family was $45,208. Males had a median income of $33,333 versus $22,727 for females. The per capita income for the town was $20,561.  About 6.9% of families and 8.8% of the population were below the poverty line, including 10.8% of those under age 18 and 21.5% of those age 65 or over.

Education 

Goshen and the neighboring town of Lempster maintained a combined elementary and middle school, called Goshen-Lempster Cooperative School, located in Lempster. The school served kindergarten through 8th grade. The cooperative was dissolved in June 2016.  The majority of Goshen elementary and middle-school aged children now attend Newport, NH schools; the Newport school system now acts as the anchor system for Goshen students.

After 8th grade, students are given the choice to attend several neighboring high schools, including Newport High School, Sunapee Middle-High School, and Kearsarge Regional High School.

Notable people 

 John Williams Gunnison (1812–1853), US Army officer, explorer of the American West

References

External links 

 
 New Hampshire Economic and Labor Market Information Bureau Profile

 
Towns in Sullivan County, New Hampshire
Towns in New Hampshire